James Kwalia C'Kurui (born James Kwalia Chepkurui on 12 June 1984) is an athlete who represents Qatar after switching from his homeland Kenya. Specializing in the 3000 and 5000 metres, his personal best times are 7:28.28 minutes and 12:54.58 minutes respectively. He was born in Trans Nzoia. He is the current holder of the Asian indoor record over 5000 m which he broke in Düsseldorf in February 2009.

Biography
He had his first success while competing for Kenya when he won the bronze medal in the 3000 m at the 2001 World Youth Championships in Athletics. His first senior medal came at the 2004 IAAF World Athletics Final, where he took the 3000 m silver. He transferred to represent Qatar following this and was very successful in Asian competitions, winning at the 2005 Asian Athletics Championships and the 2006 Asian Games.

He represented Qatar at the Olympics for the first time with an appearance at the 2008 Beijing Games – he finished eighth in the 5000 m. He improved at the next major competition, taking the bronze medal at the 2009 World Championships in Athletics. A streak of wins at Asian championships followed: he set a new Games record in the 3000 m at the 2009 Asian Indoor Games, won the 5000 m title at the 2009 Asian Athletics Championships for a second time and won his first indoor title soon after at the 2010 Asian Indoor Athletics Championships. From the beginning of his career, he was coached by the Italian Renato Canova, under the management of Gianni Demadonna.

He is from Kaptama in Mount Elgon District. Prominent runner Edith Masai is from the same area.

International competitions

References

External links 

1984 births
Living people
People from Mount Elgon District
Qatari male middle-distance runners
Qatari male long-distance runners
Kenyan male middle-distance runners
Kenyan male long-distance runners
Qatari male cross country runners
Kenyan male cross country runners
Olympic athletes of Qatar
Athletes (track and field) at the 2008 Summer Olympics
Asian Games gold medalists for Qatar
Asian Games silver medalists for Qatar
Asian Games medalists in athletics (track and field)
Athletes (track and field) at the 2006 Asian Games
Athletes (track and field) at the 2010 Asian Games
Medalists at the 2006 Asian Games
Medalists at the 2010 Asian Games
World Athletics Championships athletes for Qatar
World Athletics Championships medalists
Qatari people of Kenyan descent
Naturalised citizens of Qatar